Hernando is a common Spanish given name, equivalent to Fernando and the English Ferdinand.  It may refer to:

Places
Canada
 Hernando Island, British Columbia
United States
 Hernando, Florida 
 Hernando County, Florida
 Hernando, Mississippi
Argentina
 Hernando, Córdoba
 Hernandos Hideaway long jetty Australia

People
 Hernando de Soto (economist)
 Hernando de Soto (explorer)
 Hernando Cortes, alternate spelling of Hernán Cortés
 Mila Hernando (1957–2017), Spanish diplomat

Horse
 Hernando (horse) (1990-2013), French-trained racehorse, winner of the 1993 Prix du Jockey Club